Acrobasis vicinella is a species of snout moth in the genus Acrobasis. It was described by Hiroshi Yamanaka in 2000. It is found in Japan.

References

Moths described in 2000
Acrobasis
Moths of Japan